Alexander Muzyka (c. 1929 – February 23, 1993) was a Canadian football player who played for the Hamilton Tiger-Cats. He won the Grey Cup with Hamilton in 1953. He later worked for Bell Canada as a telephone repairman. Muzyka died after heart surgery in 1993.

References

1920s births
1993 deaths
Hamilton Tiger-Cats players
Players of Canadian football from Ontario
Sportspeople from Hamilton, Ontario